Otaihanga is on the Kapiti Coast of New Zealand's North Island.  It is just north of Paraparaumu on the south bank of the Waikanae River and is roughly 55 km north of New Zealand's capital city, Wellington.  Its name is Māori for "the place made by the tide".

The New Zealand Ministry for Culture and Heritage gives a translation of "place of Taihanga [a personal name]" for Ōtaihanga.

Demographics

Otaihanga had a population of 804 at the 2018 New Zealand census, an increase of 69 people (9.4%) since the 2013 census, and an increase of 54 people (7.2%) since the 2006 census. There were 306 households. There were 393 males and 411 females, giving a sex ratio of 0.96 males per female. The median age was 46.3 years (compared with 37.4 years nationally), with 132 people (16.4%) aged under 15 years, 138 (17.2%) aged 15 to 29, 429 (53.4%) aged 30 to 64, and 108 (13.4%) aged 65 or older.

Ethnicities were 94.8% European/Pākehā, 12.7% Māori, 1.5% Pacific peoples, 0.7% Asian, and 2.6% other ethnicities (totals add to more than 100% since people could identify with multiple ethnicities).

The proportion of people born overseas was 18.3%, compared with 27.1% nationally.

Although some people objected to giving their religion, 63.8% had no religion, 28.0% were Christian, 0.4% were Buddhist and 2.2% had other religions.

Of those at least 15 years old, 147 (21.9%) people had a bachelor or higher degree, and 114 (17.0%) people had no formal qualifications. The median income was $37,800, compared with $31,800 nationally. The employment status of those at least 15 was that 366 (54.5%) people were employed full-time, 96 (14.3%) were part-time, and 15 (2.2%) were unemployed.

The demographics for Otaihanga are also incorporated in Paraparaumu#Demographics.

Attractions 

Located in Otaihanga is one of the Kapiti Coast's most significant tourist attractions, the Southward Car Museum on Otaihanga Road between the North Island Main Trunk railway to the west and State Highway 1 to the east. It has one of the largest collections of cars in the Southern Hemisphere and contains other attractions such as heritage planes, and it has a large theatre.

Economy 

Agriculture used to take place, but has now largely ceased as residential developments have been built.  Otaihanga has become primarily residential, and some small-scale commercial businesses operate.  The Kapiti Coast's main rubbish tip is in Otaihanga.

Education 

There are no educational institutions in Otaihanga, but there are primary schools and a secondary school, Paraparaumu College, minutes away in Paraparaumu.  One of the primary schools, Kenakena School, has been involved in works to improve Otaihanga's environment at Greendale Reserve.

Environment 

As Otaihanga is on the banks of the Waikanae River, it can be susceptible to flooding during storms and periods of high rainfall.  Serious flooding in the first week of January 2005 damaged 18 houses and necessitated the evacuation to higher ground of a number of residents by boat.  After the flooding, the raising of three houses was prioritised and long term options such as upgrading flood stopbanks and extracting gravel from the riverbed were investigated.

The main parkland in Otaihanga is the Otaihanga Domain, on the banks of the Waikanae River.  It is used for leisure activities and has no sporting facilities.  It has family amenities and a footbridge across the river to Waikanae.  Another parkland, Greendale Reserve, was formerly two rundown paddocks but it has been the subject of local volunteer efforts to revitalise its environment and restore native plants.  These efforts began in 1997 and have involved the students of Kenakena School.  In 2006, the volunteer work was honoured by a Conservation Week Merit Award, with the school receiving the 2006 Young Conservationist Award.

Transport 

State Highway 1 runs through eastern Otaihanga.  The intersection of the highway and Otaihanga Road is a notorious traffic black spot and in August 2006, Transit New Zealand lowered the speed limit of the highway in the area from 100 km/h to 80 km/h as an attempt to reduce accidents. A roundabout was installed in 2013
but the design of the roundabout has been criticized.

Otaihanga is on the North Island Main Trunk railway, on a section built by the Wellington and Manawatu Railway Company. The two ends of the line met at Otaihanga and the last spike was driven at a public ceremony by Governor William Jervois. The railway opened on 3 November 1886 and passed into the ownership of the New Zealand Railways Department on 8 December 1908.  There was a passenger halt at Otaihanga until 1902. Kapiti Line commuter services stop at Paraparaumu and the terminus at Waikanae.

References

Further reading

External links 
Otaihanga from the Cyclopaedia of New Zealand, 1897

Populated places in the Wellington Region
Kapiti Coast District